The South African Theological Seminary (SATS) is a broadly evangelical distance education institution based in Bryanston (Johannesburg Region E), South Africa, founded in 1996. As of May 2018, Dr. Kevin Smith (DLitt Stellenbosch, PhD SATS) is the principal of the seminary. The seminary provides multiple undergraduate, graduate and stand alone courses to over 3000 students in over 80 countries. As of the start of 2016 SATS has graduated 574 B.Th students, 110 M.Th students and 40 PhD students.

History and programs   
The seminary was established by Dr. Christopher Peppler in 1996 and is one of the founding members of the National Association of Distance Education Organisation in South Africa (NADEOSA). SATS is accredited by the Council on Higher Education (CHE) and its qualifications are registered with the  South African Department of Higher Education and Training, which is similar and comparable to the US regional accreditation in quality. SATS has the authority to issue qualifications up to the doctorate level and provides the following programs: Undergraduate (Higher Certificate in Christian Life, Higher Certificate in Christian Counseling, Bachelor of Theology B.Th., Bachelor of Theology with a focus on Christian counselling) and post-graduate (B.Th. Honours, Master of Divinity, M.Th., Ph.D. in Theology).

SATS comes under the spiritual oversight of the elders of The Village Church which was planted by Rosebank Union Church. The seminary is broadly evangelical in its theological approach. The mission of the South African Theological Seminary is to provide Bible-based, Christ-centred and Spirit-led distance education and training to Christians, and leaders in particular, within their local church environment, to equip them to be Holy Spirit empowered members of God’s household.

Principals

Principals of SATS 

 1996-2005 Dr. Christopher Peppler (Th.D. University of Zululand).
 2006-2017 Dr. Reuben van Rensburg (Th.D. University of Zululand).
 2018–present Dr. Kevin Smith (D.Litt. University of Stellenbosch, Ph.D. South African Theological Seminary).

Webinars and Conspectus Journal 
SATS has hosted several webinars focusing on Pentecostalism in the Global South and Paul's Theology on Men and Women. Keynote speakers have included Cynthia Long Westfall and Craig S. Keener.

SATS also has a peer-reviewed academic journal called Conspectus that releases two issues per year that includes research articles, book reviews, and theses summaries. The purpose of the journal is to "provide a forum for scholarly Bible-based theological research and debate. The journal is committed to operate within an evangelical framework, namely, one that is predominantly classical and historically orthodox in its interpretive approach, and that affirms the inspiration and authority of the Judeo-Christian Scriptures. The journal seeks to publish well-researched essays and reviews on a broad range of suitable biblical and theological topics that are as clear and accessible as possible for the benefit of both specialist and non-specialist readers." The senior editor is Dr. Zoltan Erdey (PhD SATS) and the assistant editor is Dr. Robert Falconer (PhD SATS).

See also
List of universities in South Africa

References

External links

Seminaries and theological colleges in South Africa
Evangelical organizations established in the 20th century
Evangelicalism in South Africa
Education in Johannesburg
Christianity in Johannesburg
Johannesburg Region E
1996 establishments in South Africa